Blues on Fire  is the follow-up album by Pat Travers to Live at The Bamboo Room (2013). The album was released on Cleopatra Records in July 2012 and consisted of covers of blues songs from the 1920s.

Track listing

Personnel 
Pat Travers – guitars, bass guitar, vocals 
Doug Bare – organ, piano 
Carl Cleaver – piano 
Sean Shannon – drums, engineer

Technical/production 

John Lappen - A&R, Artist Relations 
Mark Prator - Mastering, Mixing 
Lucie Tran - Graphic Design 
John Wesley - Mastering, Mixing

References 

2012 albums
Pat Travers albums